Akash Deep (born 15 December 1996) is an Indian cricketer. He made his Twenty20 debut for Bengal in the 2018–19 Syed Mushtaq Ali Trophy on 9 March 2019. He made his List A debut on 24 September 2019, for Bengal in the 2019–20 Vijay Hazare Trophy. He made his first-class debut on 25 December 2019, for Bengal in the 2019–20 Ranji Trophy.

On 30 August 2021, Deep was included in the Royal Challengers Bangalore squad for the second phase of the 2021 Indian Premier League (IPL) in the UAE. In February 2022, he was bought by the Royal Challengers Bangalore in the auction for the 2022 Indian Premier League tournament.

References

External links
 

1996 births
Living people
Indian cricketers
Bengal cricketers
Royal Challengers Bangalore cricketers
Place of birth missing (living people)